The 2016 WSBL season was the 28th season of the Women's State Basketball League (SBL). The regular season began on Friday 18 March, with round 1 seeing a 2015 grand final rematch between the Rockingham Flames and Willetton Tigers. The 2016 WSBL All-Star Game was played on 6 June at Bendat Basketball Centre – the home of basketball in Western Australia. The regular season ended on Saturday 30 July. The finals began on Friday 5 August and ended on Friday 2 September, when the Tigers defeated the Joondalup Wolves in the WSBL Grand Final.

Regular season
The regular season began on Friday 18 March and ended on Saturday 30 July after 20 rounds of competition. The newly-renovated Warwick Stadium hosted big crowds for the Stirling Senators in 2016, while the Perth Redbacks moved home to the Belmont Oasis Leisure Centre after a trial year at Curtin University in 2015. Additionally, due to renovations to the Mandurah Aquatic and Recreation Centre, the Mandurah Magic hosted all of their games in 2016 at the Rockingham Flames' home venue of Mike Barnett Sports Complex.

Standings

Finals
The finals began on Friday 5 August and ended on Friday 2 September with the WSBL Grand Final.

Bracket

All-Star Game
The 2016 WSBL All-Star Game took place at Bendat Basketball Centre on Monday 6 June, with all proceeds going to Lifeline WA for suicide prevention.

Rosters

Game data

Awards

Player of the Week

Statistics leaders

Regular season
 Most Valuable Player: Alison Schwagmeyer (Lakeside Lightning)
 Coach of the Year: Craig Friday (Joondalup Wolves)
 Most Improved Player: Amy Kidner (Joondalup Wolves)
 All-Star Five:
 PG: Shani Amos (Joondalup Wolves)
 SG: Sami Whitcomb (Rockingham Flames)
 SF: Klara Wischer (Joondalup Wolves)
 PF: Candace Williams (Cockburn Cougars)
 C: Louella Tomlinson (Willetton Tigers)
 All-Defensive Five:
 PG: Shani Amos (Joondalup Wolves)
 SG: Sami Whitcomb (Rockingham Flames)
 SF: Ebony Antonio (Willetton Tigers)
 PF: Ellyce Ironmonger (Joondalup Wolves)
 C: Louella Tomlinson (Willetton Tigers)

Finals
 Grand Final MVP: Kate Malpass (Willetton Tigers)

References

External links
 2016 fixtures
 2016 media guide
 2016 transaction tracker
 2016 finals structure
 2016 Quarter Finals fixtures
 2016 Semi Finals fixtures

2016
2015–16 in Australian basketball
2016–17 in Australian basketball
basketball